is a former Japanese football player.

Playing career
Kawamura was born in Shimada on October 4, 1979. He joined the J1 League club Júbilo Iwata  youth team in 1998. He also moved to the Argentine club River Plate on loan in 1999. He played many matches as mainly defensive midfielder from 2001 and the club won the championship in the 2002 J1 League and the 2003 Emperor's Cup. However his opportunity to play decreased in 2005. In 2006, he moved to Cerezo Osaka. Although he played many matches, the club was relegated to the J2 League at the end of the 2006 season. In 2007, he moved to Kawasaki Frontale. Although he could not play many matches, the club won second place at the 2007 J.League Cup. In 2008, he returned to Júbilo Iwata. However he could not play many matches. In 2009, he moved to the J2 club Tokyo Verdy and he played many matches. In 2010, he moved to Thailand and played for Police United (2010), TOT (2011–15), and BEC Tero Sasana (2016). He retired at the end of the 2016 season.

Club statistics

Honors and awards

Club
Júbilo Iwata
 J1 League: 2002
 Emperor's Cup: 2003
 Japanese Super Cup: 2003, 2004

References

External links
 

1979 births
Living people
Association football people from Shizuoka Prefecture
Japanese footballers
J1 League players
J2 League players
Takahiro Kawamura
Júbilo Iwata players
Club Atlético River Plate footballers
Cerezo Osaka players
Kawasaki Frontale players
Tokyo Verdy players
Takahiro Kawamura
Takahiro Kawamura
Japanese expatriate footballers
Expatriate footballers in Argentina
Japanese expatriate sportspeople in Thailand
Expatriate footballers in Thailand
Association football midfielders